The  was a Japanese passenger ship which, renamed Kamakura Maru, was sunk during World War II, killing 2,035 soldiers and civilians on board.

The Chichibu Maru was built for the Nippon Yusen shipping company by the Yokohama Dock Company. She was launched on 8 May 1929 and completed in 1930. She had a beam of 22.6 meters, a length of 178 meters and a tonnage of 17,498. Cruising speed was 19 knots, with a maximum of 21 knots. The ship could carry 817 passengers. She differed from her half-sisters, the Asama Maru and the Tatsuta Maru, in her propulsion system, and in having one (rather than two) funnels.

Before the war, the ship carried passengers between Yokohama and San Francisco. Prince Takamatsu and Princess Takamatsu also traveled on this ship. Following the adoption of Kunrei-shiki romanization the ship was renamed Kamakura Maru in 1939.

Requisition in World War II
In 1942 she was requisitioned by the Imperial Japanese Navy to serve as a troop transport ship, and also as hospital ship.

Role in Wartime Personnel Exchanges
Despite hostilities between various nations during WW2, a number of interchanges of prisoners, diplomats and other personnel took place amongst the warring parties. These usually occurred over long distances utilising neutral ports. The Kamakura Maru was a participant in one of the most significant of these exchanges.
 
On 10 August 1942, she departed Yokohama with British diplomats and members of other foreign diplomatic delegations and civilians. On the 14 August 1942, she arrived at Shanghai where she was joined by another exchange vessel Tatsuta Maru carrying Sir Robert Craigie, the British Ambassador and other diplomats. The Kamakura Maru picked up another 903 British and foreign nationals in Shanghai. The following day both ships sailed for Saigon and then Singapore picking up a few more foreign nationals at each place.
 
Meanwhile, on the 18 August 1942, the SS City of Canterbury in Melbourne, Australia, embarked the Japanese Minister (Ambassador) to Australia, Kawai Tatsuo, and 870 other Japanese officials and their families and a few Siamese nationals for repatriation. Minister Kawai took aboard four white boxes containing the ashes of Japanese midget submariners killed in the 31 May 1942 attack on Sydney Harbour.
 
On the 6th of September 1942 the Kamakura Maru arrived at Lourenco Marques, Portuguese East Africa. The Japanese passengers are disembarked from SS City of Canterbury and embarked on the Kamakura Maru. The ship loaded 47,710 Red Cross parcels for POWs in the Far East.

The western nationals were disembarked from Kamakura Maru, with 115 Australian, British and Allied nationals embarked on SS City of Canterbury for the return voyage to Australia. Other repatriates waited for transportation on other vessels.

On the 11 September 1942 the Kamakura Maru arrived at Singapore disembarking 289 Japanese and delivered 14,770 parcels for POWs. In early October 1942 it arrived at Hong Kong with 32,940 parcels for POWs.

On the 8 October 1942 Kamakura Maru arrived in Yokohama, where several thousand people were present as Minister Kawai handed over the boxes of ashes to relatives of the midget submariners.

The Asama Maru was involved in a similar diplomatic exchange in July 1942, paired with the MS Gripsholm, also at Lourenco Marques, mainly with American diplomats being exchanged. Thus all three of the sister ships were involved in this unique type of operation.

Sinking
On April 28, 1943, the Kamakura Maru, sailing from Manila to Singapore and carrying some 2,500 soldiers and civilians. The vessel was unescorted in the Sulu Sea 15 miles southwest of Naso Point, Panay Island, Philippine Islands. The US submarine USS Gudgeon fired a spread of four torpedoes at the Japanese vessel at 3,200 yards range. After two minutes there were two explosions. The Kamakura Maru was hit twice on her starboard side at the No. 4 hold where fuel and vehicles immediately caught fire which rapidly spread. Twelve minutes after the strike there was an explosion and the ship upended and sank by the stern. The US submarine passed through the area where the ship sank and reported a dozen lifeboats and floating debris and a large number of people  in the water.

Four days later, 465 survivors (28 sailors out of 176 crew, and 437 passengers)  were rescued from the sea by Japanese ships, implying some 2,035 people were killed. The Japanese crew failed to send out a distress signal before the ship sank, thus no one suspected its loss until 3 May 1943.

Pictures

References

M/S Chichibu Maru
A photo with Prince and Princess Takamatsu onboard 
Wreck site MV Kamakura Maru

See also
List by death toll of ships sunk by submarines
Foreign commerce and shipping of Empire of Japan
Attack on Sydney Harbour: Aftermath

1929 ships
Empire of Japan
Ships of the NYK Line
Steamships
Ocean liners
Auxiliary ships of the Imperial Japanese Navy
World War II passenger ships of Japan
World War II merchant ships of Japan
Ships sunk by American submarines
World War II shipwrecks in the Pacific Ocean
Maritime incidents in April 1943
Japanese hell ships